HNLMS Snellius may refer to the following ships of the Royal Netherlands Navy that have been named after Willebrord Snellius:

 , was the lead ship of her class of hydrographic survey vessels
 , a Snellius-class hydrographic survey vessel

Royal Netherlands Navy ship names